Three ships of the French Navy have borne the name Gorgone:

 , a second class paddle corvette launched in 1848 and wrecked in 1869.
 , a  launched in 1915 and struck in 1935.
 , an  scrapped incomplete on slip in 1940.

French Navy ship names